WrestleMania 16 (marketed as WrestleMania 2000) was the 16th annual WrestleMania professional wrestling pay-per-view (PPV) event produced by the World Wrestling Federation (WWF, now WWE). It took place on April 2, 2000, at the Arrowhead Pond of Anaheim in Anaheim, California. A total of nine matches were contested on the event's card.

The main event was a four-way elimination match for the WWF Championship involving reigning champion Triple H, The Rock, Mick Foley, and The Big Show, which Triple H won after last eliminating The Rock, in the first time a heel won the main event of WrestleMania. Main matches on the undercard included a triangle ladder match for the WWF Tag Team Championship involving Edge and Christian, The Hardy Boyz, and The Dudley Boyz, and a two-fall triple threat match for the WWF Intercontinental and European Championships involving Kurt Angle, Chris Jericho and Chris Benoit.

Production

Background
WrestleMania is considered the World Wrestling Federation's (WWF, now WWE) flagship pay-per-view (PPV) event, having first been held in 1985. It has become the longest-running professional wrestling event in history and is held annually between mid-March to mid-April. It was the first of the WWF's original four pay-per-views, which includes Royal Rumble, SummerSlam, and Survivor Series, which were dubbed the "Big Four", and was considered one of the "Big Five" PPVs, along with King of the Ring. The 16th WrestleMania was titled WrestleMania 2000 due to it taking place in the year 2000. It was scheduled to be held on April 2, 2000, at the Arrowhead Pond of Anaheim in Anaheim, California.

Storylines

WWF Championship
The main feud heading into WrestleMania was over the WWF Championship and involved two feuds that had become intertwined over the previous two months and eventually drew in the McMahon family.

On the January 3rd, 2000 edition of Raw, Triple H regained the WWF Championship, which he had previously lost to The Big Show at Survivor Series in November 1999 due to underhanded means. He also used his position of husband to Stephanie McMahon-Helmsley, to exert control over the company and his rivals. This would lead to the firing of Mick Foley, his most vocal rival. Foley, however, was later reinstated and reverted from his Mankind persona to his more violent Cactus Jack persona, challenging Triple H to a street fight at the Royal Rumble later that January, which the champion won.

Meanwhile, after Big Show's loss, he began showing signs of disdain toward The Rock in interviews. Shortly thereafter, he abandoned The Rock in several tag matches featuring the two and eventually attacked him, turning heel and declaring his intent to win the Royal Rumble match and regain the WWF Championship. Big Show and Rock both entered the Rumble and were the last two men left in the ring, and Rock apparently won the match after pulling himself back into the ring before Big Show tumbled to the floor. However, Big Show protested Rock's victory, and insisted that he did not lose the match. Big Show then proceeded to produce video footage that showed The Rock had in fact touched the floor with both feet before Big Show did.

Heading into No Way Out on February 27, a double main event was signed. Triple H would defend the WWF Championship against Cactus Jack in a Hell in a Cell match, with Cactus being forced to retire from wrestling, should he lose. The winner of that match would face the winner of a match earlier in the night between The Rock and Big Show, for the right to go to WrestleMania and face the champion.

During the #1 contender's match, Rock had hit the Rock Bottom on Big Show and was about to deliver the People’s Elbow when Shane McMahon, who had not been seen on WWF television since he left the company in December 1999, came to the ring and laid The Rock out with a steel chair shot, enabling Big Show to get the pinfall victory and earn the title shot.

Later in the night, the bout between Triple H and Cactus Jack would spill outside of the cell and end up on the roof, where Cactus lit a 2x4 wrapped in barbed wire ablaze and attempted to deliver a Piledriver to Triple H onto it. Triple H reversed it by backdropping Cactus, causing him to fall through a panel in the cell’s ceiling and hit the ring with enough force to break the ring mat. Once back inside, the champion hit the Pedigree on the challenger to win the match, retain his title, and send Cactus Jack into retirement.

The night after No Way Out, Triple H informed the defeated Rock that he had to start all the way at the bottom of the pecking order since he was no longer the number one contender, and forced him into a match with The Brooklyn Brawler. Rock easily won the match and proceeded to call Triple H out afterward. Stephanie would then decide to give Rock a chance to be added into the WrestleMania main event, provided he could pin either Triple H or Big Show, who had formed a formidable, but uneasy alliance in the previous weeks in spite of Big Show’s challenger status to Triple H, in a handicap match in that night's main event. Rock won the match, but did so after Shane interfered and broke up a pin attempt. Since this resulted in a disqualification victory for The Rock instead of a pinfall victory, he was not added into the match.

Two weeks later, Rock challenged Big Show yet again and this time agreed to put his career on the line in order to get to WrestleMania. Shane would go on to appoint himself as the special guest referee, but during the course of the match, Vince McMahon returned from his own exile following Stephanie’s betrayal of him at Armageddon the previous December. He knocked Shane out with a chair and counted the pin for Rock, who won his way into the WrestleMania main event, making it a Triple Threat match.

The following week on Raw, Vince announced that the Triple Threat match between the three men would take place that night instead of waiting until WrestleMania. Triple H reluctantly agreed on the terms that the match not take place at WrestleMania under any circumstances. With Stephanie in his corner, Shane in Big Show’s corner, and Vince in Rock’s corner, Triple H would emerge victorious and retain the championship after pinning Big Show with the Pedigree. After the match, however, Linda McMahon appeared and informed Triple H that he would indeed be defending the WWF Championship at WrestleMania against not only The Rock and Big Show, but a newly reinstated Mick Foley as well in a Fatal-4-Way Elimination Match. Foley then immediately came out and attacked Triple H. Linda would then announce on the March 24th edition of SmackDown! later that week that she would be in Foley’s corner for the match.

Other storylines
Another major feud that had been developing going into the show featured Chris Jericho. At No Way Out in February, Jericho lost his Intercontinental Championship to then-European Champion Kurt Angle after Angle hit him with the title belt behind the referee’s back, causing Angle to become a double champion. Over the following weeks, Jericho would make several attempts to regain the championship, with all attempts being unsuccessful, largely due to Angle's sudden partnership with WWF legend Bob Backlund, who had briefly returned to the company. While feuding with Angle, Jericho also started a rivalry with The Radicalz, as Chris Benoit was also trying to win the Intercontinental Championship, while Eddie Guerrero was subsequently trying to woo Jericho’s valet Chyna. Eventually, a two-fall match between Angle, Benoit, and Jericho was signed for WrestleMania. The first fall would be contested for the Intercontinental Championship, and the second fall would be contested for the European Championship.

Another major feud heading into the event was between Edge and Christian, The Hardy Boyz (Matt Hardy and Jeff Hardy), and The Dudley Boyz (Bubba Ray Dudley and D-Von Dudley) for the WWF Tag Team Championship. On the January 17th edition of Raw, Jeff Hardy was scheduled to face Bubba Ray Dudley in a singles match. The match saw Jeff pinning Bubba Ray after delivering a Swanton Bomb. After the match, the Dudleys attacked the Hardys, in which they powerbombed Matt on top of a table. Later that week, on the January 20th edition of SmackDown!, Matt was placed in a singles match with D-Von Dudley. The win was given to Matt via disqualification, after Jeff and Bubba Ray made their way to the ring, causing both teams to begin brawling with one another. Bubba Ray prepared to powerbomb Matt off the stage, onto some tables that were set up by the Dudleys. Bubba Ray, however, was hit by Jeff with a chair, causing him to fall onto the tables below. The Hardys then set up a table of their own, and Matt proceeded to perform a legdrop on D-Von through the table. At the Royal Rumble, the Hardys defeated the Dudleys in a tag team tables match, with Jeff performing a Swanton Bomb onto D-Von from the arena's balcony. The following night on Raw, the Dudleys showed respect towards the Hardys, and stated they would help them defeat the New Age Outlaws later that night for the WWF Tag Team Championships. In return, the Hardys would have to grant the Dudleys a title shot at the titles. However, during the match, the Dudleys stopped the three count, after the Hardys had the match in their favor, which allowed the Outlaws to retain the titles. After the match, the Dudleys then proceeded to perform the 3-D on each of the Hardys. The Dudleys would go on to successfully defeat the Outlaws at No Way Out to win the Tag Team Championships. Later that night, Edge & Christian defeated the Hardy Boyz in a #1 Contender's match after Terri Runnels, who had been managing the Hardys, turned heel and cost them the match. Over the following weeks, the two teams would begin a feud in which they trash-talked each other in interviews, and cost each other matches. It was later announced that all three teams would face each other for the WWF Tag Team Championships at WrestleMania in a Triangle Ladder match.

Another unique storyline that was developing around this time revolved around the WWF Hardcore Championship. On the February 24th edition of SmackDown!, Crash Holly defeated Test for the Hardcore Championship with help from his cousin Hardcore Holly. After the match, a jubilant Crash declared that he would defend the title any time, at any place, 24 hours a day, 7 days a week, so long as there was a referee present. This magnificently backfired on Crash, as he would be ambushed and challenged in impromtu matches for the title in various places such as a laundromat, a hotel room, an amusement park, and even the baggage claim at Newark Liberty International Airport. Although Crash was able to retain his title or regain it after briefly losing it each time he was confronted, the constant looking over his shoulder drove Crash crazy, and a battle royal featuring most of the wrestlers who had been ambushing Crash was signed for WrestleMania.

Event

Preliminary matches
Before the opening video, Lilian Garcia sang  "The Star-Spangled Banner". The first match that aired was a tag team match between the team of The Godfather and D'Lo Brown (who were accompanied to the ring by the Godfather's Ho Train and rapper Ice-T, who also sang their entrance music) against the team of The Big Boss Man and Bull Buchanan. The Godfather and Brown gained the early advantage over Buchanan and Bossman, as they were able to execute a leg drop and a splash combination. Buchanan and Bossman, yet, retaliated after Bossman delivered a Sidewalk slam and Buchanan delivered a Leg drop from the top turnbuckle into a pinfall and winning the match.

The second match was a hardcore battle royal for the WWF Hardcore Championship featuring champion Crash Holly defending against The Mean Street Posse, The APA, Kaientai, The Headbangers, Tazz, Viscera, and Hardcore Holly The rules of the match were as follows: the match would go on for fifteen minutes, the championship could exchange hands an unlimited number of times during the time limit, and the final wrestler with the Hardcore Championship would win the match and remain the Hardcore Champion. The first championship exchange occurred after Tazz pinned Crash, which proceeded with Viscera pinning Tazz. The third championship exchange occurred after Funaki pinned Viscera, however, Funaki was then pinned by Rodney. The fifth championship exchange occurred after Joey Abs pinned Rodney, which proceeded with Abs being pinned by Thrasher. The seventh title exchange occurred after Pete Gas pinned Thrasher, though, Gas was then pinned by Tazz. The ninth title exchange occurred after Crash pinned Tazz, which proceeded with the final championship exchange, as Hardcore Holly pinned Crash in a controversial ending. Despite this, Hardcore Holly officially won the Hardcore Championship.

The next match was a tag team match between the team of Al Snow and Steve Blackman against the team of T & A (Test and Albert). Back and forth action between the two teams towards the end of the match, where Albert delivered a Baldo Bomb on Snow, while Test delivered an Elbow drop from the top rope onto Blackman into a pinfall for the win.

The fourth match was a WWF Tag Team Championship triangle ladder match involving The Hardy Boyz, Edge and Christian, and champions The Dudley Boyz. Edge and Christian first gained the advantage after Edge climbed the top rope and speared Jeff, who was climbing a ladder. Edge and Christian were then given consecutive 3-D's by The Dudley Boyz. The Dudley Boyz then brought tables into the ring and onto ringside, where D-Von unsuccessfully attempted to splash Jeff through a table in the ring, while Bubba powerbombed Matt through another table at ringside. The Hardy Boyz would then retaliate after Jeff delivered a Swanton bomb off a ladder onto Bubba, through a table. As Jeff did so, Matt climbed a ladder, along with Edge and Christian, who pushed Matt off the ladder through a table. The situation allowed Edge and Christian to reach and grab the championship belts that were hung from the rafters, thus gaining their first Tag Team Championship.

The fifth match was a Catfight between The Kat and Terri with special guest referee, Val Venis; the winner of the match was determined by the diva who threw their opponent out onto ringside. The Kat threw Terri out to ringside; however, Venis distracted by Mae Young, who was at ringside managing The Kat, and thus was unable to see the action. Terri was again thrown onto ringside by The Kat; however, once again, the action was not seen by Venis as he was distracted by Young. In retaliation, The Fabulous Moolah, who was at ringside managing Terri, pulled The Kat out of the ring, which was seen by Venis, thus declaring Terri the winner the match. Whilst celebrating, Mae Young attacked Terri and The Fabulous Moolah before giving Moolah the bronco buster whilst Kat stripped Terri of her clothing.

Next was an Intergender tag team match between the team of Too Cool (Grand Master Sexay and Scotty 2 Hotty) and Chyna against the team of The Radicalz (Perry Saturn, Dean Malenko, Eddie Guerrero). Both teams fought back and forth towards the end of the match, where Chyna was tagged into the match and delivered a press slam, powerbomb, and a sleeper slam to pin Guerrero for the win.

The seventh match was a two-fall triple threat match for both the WWF Intercontinental and WWF European Championship, involving Kurt Angle, Chris Benoit, and Chris Jericho. The first fall would be for the Intercontinental Championship, while the second fall was for the European Championship. At the beginning of the first fall, all three men exchanged pin attempts leading into midway into the match where Benoit broke up a Chicken wing submission by Angle onto Jericho. The situation allowed Benoit to climb to the top turnbuckle and delivered a Diving headbutt on Jericho into a pinfall to win the Intercontinental Championship. During the second fall, Jericho delivered a double powerbomb onto Angle, which proceeded into Benoit delivering three German suplexes onto Jericho. Afterwards, Benoit attempted to deliver another diving headbutt onto Angle, however, Angle moved out of the way, resulting in Benoit hitting the ring mat. This situation allowed Jericho to deliver a Lionsault into a pinfall to win the European Championship. Therefore, Kurt Angle lost both titles without conceding to a single pinfall.

The final match on the undercard was the tag team encounter between Kane and Rikishi against D-Generation X (X-Pac and Road Dogg). Shortly into the match, Rikishi delivered a Diamond cutter onto X-Pac, which proceeded into Kane delivering a Tombstone piledriver to win by pinfall. Afterward, an in-ring dancing segment involving Rikishi, Too Cool, and the San Diego Chicken was interrupted by Kane, who thought the chicken was Pete Rose, who had tried to attack Kane the previous year. Rose then snuck into the ring and tried to hit Kane with a baseball bat, before being chokeslammed by Kane and stinkfaced by Rikishi.

Main event match
The main event was a WWF Championship four-way elimination match involving The Big Show (with Shane McMahon), Mick Foley (with Linda McMahon), The Rock (with Vince McMahon), and the defending champion, Triple H (with Stephanie McMahon). In the beginning of the match, Big Show press slammed Triple H and Rock; however, all three competitors then attacked Big Show. This situation allowed The Rock to eliminate Big Show, after delivering a Rock Bottom into a pinfall. After the elimination, Foley delivered a double arm DDT on Triple H. However, Triple H retaliated, performing a Pedigree on Foley onto a steel chair; this resulted in a pinfall and Foley's elimination. After Foley was eliminated, he returned to the ring and attacked Triple H with a barbed wire 2x4. The Rock and Triple H would proceed to brawl in and out of the ring with neither superstar gaining the advantage over one another. Vince attacked Triple H, which led to Shane returning to ringside in which he attacked his father, assaulting him with a steel chair which had led to Vince bleeding from the forehead. Shane, who was preparing to execute a chair shot on The Rock, failed when Vince returned and threw Shane out the ring. Vince had then picked up the steel chair and was preparing to attack Triple H with it, but in a shocking and unexpected swerve, Vince instead hit The Rock with the steel chair, thus turning heel. After a second chair shot towards The Rock by Vince, with the former being able to kick out of Triple H's first attempted pinfall towards him. After another chair shot from Vince, Triple H then pinned The Rock for a second time and was able to get a successful pinfall against him, thus retaining the championship, and became the first ever heel to win the main event of Wrestlemania. After the match, The Rock, who was badly bruised and being helped out of the ring and towards the backstage by official referees, angrily returned to the ring and proceeded to execute Rock Bottoms on Vince, Shane, and Stephanie McMahon, before executing a People's Elbow on Stephanie to close the show.

Reception

WrestleMania 2000 was met with a mixed critical response. John Powell of Canadian Online Explorer's professional wrestling section called the event "a flop" and opined that "It was supposed to be sports entertainment's greatest event of the year. It was supposed to the best the WWF has to offer. It wasn't. ... WrestleMania 2000 from The Pond in Anaheim, California, will go down as one of the worst WrestleManias the World Wrestling Federation has produced in its 15-year history of broadcasting the flagship spectacle. ... The only one-on-one match being the ludicrous Catfight between Terri and The Kat, the other congested WrestleMania bouts suffered from constant stalling of one form or another as wrestlers lay prone for extended periods of time or engaged in low-impact brawling on the outside of the ring so that the audience could direct their attention to the other participants. This approach left many WWF superstars looking foolish for selling holds longer than they needed to. ... Ironically, the first-ever All-Day-Long pre-show recapping the history of WrestleMania for eight hours prior to the premiere wrestling event was better than the card itself." He gave the overall event a score of 3 out of 10 stars, which is a considerably lower score than the previous year's event which received a rating of 5 out of 10 stars. The main event between Triple H, Mick Foley, The Big Show and The Rock for the WWF Championship was rated 4 out of 10 stars, and both the Two-fall Triple Threat Match for the WWF Intercontinental and European Championships between Kurt Angle, Chris Jericho and Chris Benoit and the Triangle Ladder match for the WWF Tag Team Championship between The Dudley Boyz, The Hardy Boyz and Edge and Christian both received the highest rating of 8 out of 10 stars and The Cat Fight between Terri and The Kat received the lowest rating of 0 out of 10 stars.

In 2009, Rob McNew of 411Mania gave the event a rating of 5.0 [Not So Good], stating, "This show was so disappointing, because the WWF for most every show in 2000 could do no wrong, but they managed to screw up the biggest show of the year by making the main event an after thought in the McMahon family drama. There were some high points on this card, and the main event was very solid action wise questionable booking aside. There is still no explanation for what happened at the end. You can’t even blame Russo because he was already in WCW running them into the ground."

Aftermath
After the event, The Rock continued to feud with Triple H over the WWF Championship. The feud continued on the first Raw after WrestleMania, where The Rock pinned Triple H in a non-title match. The following week on Raw, the feud intensified, where The Rock defeated The Big Boss Man and Bull Buchanan in a handicap steel cage match. After the match Triple H, Shane and Vince McMahon attacked The Rock, however, which caused him to lose a great amount of blood. Later that week on SmackDown!, it was announced that The Rock would face Triple H for the WWF Championship at Backlash. At Backlash, The Rock, with help from Stone Cold Steve Austin and Linda McMahon, defeated Triple H to win the WWF Championship.

Also the next night on Raw, Eddie Guerrero defeated Chris Jericho to win the European Championship with help from Chyna who turned on Jericho, and aligned herself wirh Guerrero.

Video ban in Ireland 
The Irish Film Classification Office banned the video release of the event, owing to its use of realistic weapons, including metal chairs, timber wrapped with barbed wire, shinai and sledgehammers. Deputy censor Audrey Conlon also cited the "gladiatorial bloodlust" of the crowd baying for increasingly extreme violence. Clear Vision Ltd., which released material from the WWF under its Silver Vision imprint, lodged an appeal (the result of which is unknown) and claimed that "our fans love the wild soap opera element", but the IFCO countered this by stating, "This is one of the most dangerous and pernicious aspects of the entire business. The universal distinguishing feature of all soap opera is that the storylines are regularly made more explicit and, in many instances, more violent, simply to keep audience share."

Results

References

External links

Wrestlemania 16
Professional wrestling in Anaheim, California
2000 in California
Events in Anaheim, California
2000 WWF pay-per-view events
April 2000 events in the United States